Major League Baseball (MLB) is a professional baseball organization and the oldest major professional sports league in the world. MLB is composed of 30 teams, divided equally between the National League (NL) and the American League (AL), with 29 in the United States and 1 in Canada. Formed in 1876 and 1901 respectively, the NL and AL cemented their cooperation with the National Agreement in 1903. They remained legally separate entities until 2000, when they merged into a single organization led by the Commissioner of Baseball. MLB is headquartered in Midtown Manhattan. It is considered one of the major professional sports leagues in the United States and Canada.

Baseball's first all-professional team, the Cincinnati Red Stockings, was founded in 1869. The first few decades of professional baseball saw rivalries between leagues, and players often jumped from one team or league to another. The period before 1920 was the dead-ball era, when home runs were rarely hit. Professional baseball survived the Black Sox Scandal, a conspiracy to fix the 1919 World Series, then rose in popularity in the following decade. It survived the Great Depression and World War II. Shortly after the war, Jackie Robinson broke baseball's color barrier.

The 1950s and 1960s saw the AL and NL add clubs; some moved around the country. Modern stadiums with artificial turf surfaces began to change the game in the 1970s and 1980s. Home runs dominated the game during the 1990s. In the mid-2000s, media reports disclosed the use of anabolic steroids among MLB players; a 2006-07 investigation produced the Mitchell Report, which found that many players had used steroids and other performance-enhancing substances, including at least one player from each team.

Each team plays 162 games per season, and six teams in each league advance to a four-round postseason tournament that culminates in the World Series, a best-of-seven championship series between the two league champions first played in 1903. The New York Yankees have the most championships: 27. The reigning champions are the Houston Astros, who defeated the Philadelphia Phillies, 4–2, in the 2022 World Series. 

MLB is the second-wealthiest professional sport league by revenue after the National Football League (NFL). Baseball games are broadcast on television, radio, and the internet throughout North America and in several other countries. MLB has the highest total season attendance of any sports league in the world; in 2018, it drew more than 69.6 million spectators.

MLB also oversees Minor League Baseball, which comprises lower-tier teams affiliated with the major league clubs. MLB and the World Baseball Softball Confederation jointly manage the international World Baseball Classic tournament.

Organizational structure
MLB is governed by the Major League Baseball Constitution. This document has undergone several incarnations since its creation in 1876. Under the direction of the Commissioner of Baseball, MLB hires and maintains the sport's umpiring crews, and negotiates marketing, labor, and television contracts. MLB maintains a unique, controlling relationship over the sport, including most aspects of Minor League Baseball. This is due in large part to the 1922 U.S. Supreme Court ruling in Federal Baseball Club v. National League, which held that baseball is not interstate commerce and therefore not subject to federal antitrust law; MLB is the only league that has such a status, and has not faced any competition since this case. This ruling has been weakened only slightly in subsequent years. The weakened ruling granted more stability to the owners of teams and has resulted in values increasing at double-digit rates. There were several challenges to MLB's primacy in the sport, with notable attempts to establish competing leagues occurring during the late 1800s, from 1913 to 1915 with the short-lived Federal League, and in 1960 with the aborted Continental League.

The chief executive of MLB is the commissioner, currently Rob Manfred. The deputy commissioner of baseball administration and chief legal officer is currently Dan Halem. There are seven other executives: executive vice president and general counsel, chief operations and strategy officer, chief communications officer, chief financial officer and senior advisor, executive vice president and chief marketing officer, chief revenue officer, and chief baseball development officer.

The multimedia branch of MLB is MLB Advanced Media, which is based in New York City. This branch oversees MLB.com and each of the 30 teams' websites. Its charter states that MLB Advanced Media holds editorial independence from the league, but it is under the same ownership group and revenue-sharing plan. MLB Productions is a similarly structured wing of the league, focusing on video and traditional broadcast media. MLB also owns 67 percent of MLB Network, with the other 33 percent split between several cable operators and satellite provider DirecTV. It operates out of studios in Secaucus, New Jersey, and also has editorial independence from the league.

League organization
In 1920, the weak National Commission, which had been created to manage relationships between the two leagues, was replaced with the much more powerful Commissioner of Baseball, who had the power to make decisions for all of professional baseball unilaterally. From 1901 to 1960, the American and National Leagues fielded eight teams apiece.

In the 1960s, MLB expansion added eight teams, including the first non-U.S. team (the Montreal Expos). Two teams (the Seattle Mariners and the Toronto Blue Jays) were also added in the 1970s. From 1969 through 1993, each league consisted of an East and West Division. In 1993, the National League expanded with two teams, the Florida Marlins and the Colorado Rockies, to even up the number of teams in both leagues. A third division, the Central Division, was formed in each league in 1994. Until 1996, the two leagues met on the field only during the World Series and the All-Star Game. Regular-season interleague play was introduced in 1997.

In March 1995, two new franchises, the Arizona Diamondbacks and Tampa Bay Devil Rays (now known as the Tampa Bay Rays), were awarded by MLB, which began play in 1998. This addition brought the total number of franchises to 30. In early 1997, MLB decided to assign one new team to each league: Tampa Bay joined the AL and Arizona joined the NL. The original plan was to have an odd number of teams in each league (15 per league, with five in each division), but in order for every team to be able to play daily, this would have required interleague play to be scheduled throughout the entire season. However, it was unclear at the time if the interleague play would continue after the 1998 season, as it had to be approved by the players' union. For this and other reasons, it was decided that both leagues should continue to have an even number of teams, and therefore, one existing club would have to switch leagues. The Milwaukee Brewers agreed in November 1997 to move from the AL to the NL, thereby making the NL a 16-team league. At the same time, the Detroit Tigers agreed to move from the AL East to the AL Central (to replace Milwaukee), with the expansion Tampa Bay Devil Rays joining the AL East. Later, when the Houston Astros changed ownership prior to the 2013 season, the team moved from the NL Central to the AL West, resulting in both leagues having three divisions of five teams each and allowing all teams to have a more balanced schedule. Interleague play is now held throughout the season.

In 2000, the AL and NL were dissolved as legal entities, and MLB became a single, overall league de jure, similar to the National Football League (NFL), National Basketball Association (NBA) and National Hockey League (NHL)—albeit with two components called "leagues" instead of "conferences". The same rules and regulations are used in both leagues, with one former exception: the AL operated under the designated hitter (DH) rule, while the NL did not. This difference in rules between leagues was unique to MLB, as the other major professional sports leagues in the U.S. and Canada have one set of rules for all teams.

In 2020, the National League (NL) used the designated hitter (DH) rule for the first time. As part of the settlement of the 2021–22 Major League Baseball lockout, this change was made permanent thus making the rules in the two leagues identical.

Teams

An asterisk (*) denotes a relocation of a franchise. See respective team articles for more information.

History

Founding
In the 1860s, aided by soldiers playing the game in camp during the Civil War, "New York"-style baseball expanded into a national game and spawned baseball's first governing body, the National Association of Base Ball Players (NABBP). The NABBP existed as an amateur league for 12 years. By 1867, more than 400 clubs were members. Most of the strongest clubs remained those based in the Northeastern United States. For professional baseball's founding year, MLB uses the year 1869—when the first professional team, the Cincinnati Red Stockings, was established.

A schism developed between professional and amateur ballplayers after the founding of the Cincinnati club. The NABBP split into an amateur organization and a professional organization. The National Association of Professional Base Ball Players, often known as the National Association (NA), was formed in 1871. Its amateur counterpart disappeared after only a few years. The modern Chicago Cubs and Atlanta Braves franchises trace their histories back to the National Association of Professional Base Ball Players in the 1870s.

In 1876, the National League of Professional Base Ball Clubs (later known as the National League or NL) was established after the NA proved ineffective. The league placed its emphasis on clubs rather than on players. Clubs could now enforce player contracts, preventing players from jumping to higher-paying clubs. Clubs were required to play the full schedule of games instead of forfeiting scheduled games when the club was no longer in the running for the league championship, which happened frequently under the NA. A concerted effort was made to curb gambling on games, which was leaving the validity of results in doubt. The first game in the NL—on Saturday, April 22, 1876 (at Jefferson Street Grounds in Philadelphia)—is often pointed to as the beginning of MLB.

The early years of the NL were tumultuous, with threats from rival leagues and a rebellion by players against the hated "reserve clause", which restricted the free movement of players between clubs. Teams came and went; 1882 was the first season where the league's membership was the same as the preceding season's, and only four franchises survived to see 1900. Competitor leagues formed regularly and also disbanded regularly. The most successful was the American Association (1882–1891), sometimes called the "beer and whiskey league" for its tolerance of the sale of alcoholic beverages to spectators. For several years, the NL and American Association champions met in a postseason championship series—the first attempt at a World Series. The two leagues merged in 1892 as a single 12-team NL, but the NL dropped four teams after the 1899 season. This led to the formation of the American League in 1901 under AL president Ban Johnson, and the resulting bidding war for players led to widespread contract-breaking and legal disputes.

The war between the AL and NL caused shock waves throughout the baseball world. At a meeting at the Leland Hotel in Chicago in 1901, the other baseball leagues negotiated a plan to maintain their independence. A new National Association was formed to oversee these minor leagues.

After 1902, the NL, AL, and NA signed a new National Agreement which tied independent contracts to the reserve-clause contracts. The agreement also set up a formal classification system for minor leagues, the forerunner of today's system that was refined by Branch Rickey.

Other recognized leagues
Several other early defunct baseball leagues are officially considered major leagues, and their statistics and records are included with those of the two current major leagues. In 1969, the Special Baseball Records Committee of Major League Baseball officially recognized six major leagues: the National League, American League, American Association, Union Association (1884), Players' League (1890), and Federal League (1914–1915). The status of the National Association as a major league has been a point of dispute among baseball researchers; while its statistics are not recognized by Major League Baseball, its statistics are included with those of other major leagues by some baseball reference websites, such as Retrosheet. Some researchers, including Nate Silver, dispute the major-league status of the Union Association by pointing out that franchises came and went and that the St. Louis club was deliberately "stacked"; the St. Louis club was owned by the league's president and it was the only club that was close to major-league caliber. In December 2020, Major League Baseball announced its recognition of seven leagues within Negro league baseball as major leagues, and in 2021, baseball reference website Baseball-Reference.com began to include statistics from those seven leagues into their major-league statistics.

Dead-ball era

The period between 1900 and 1919 is commonly referred to as the "dead-ball era". Games of this era tended to be low-scoring and were often dominated by pitchers, such as Walter Johnson, Cy Young, Christy Mathewson, Mordecai Brown, and Grover Cleveland Alexander. The term also accurately describes the condition of the baseball itself. The baseball used American rather than the modern Australian wool yarn and was not wound as tightly, affecting the distance that it would travel. More significantly, balls were kept in play until they were mangled, soft and sometimes lopsided. During this era, a baseball cost three dollars, equal to $ today (in inflation-adjusted USD), and owners were reluctant to purchase new balls. Fans were expected to throw back fouls and (rare) home runs. Baseballs also became stained with tobacco juice, grass, and mud, and sometimes the juice of licorice, which some players would chew for the purpose of discoloring the ball.

Also, pitchers could manipulate the ball through the use of the spitball. (In 1921 use of this pitch was restricted to a few pitchers with a grandfather clause.) Hitting methods like the Baltimore Chop were used to increase the number of infield singles. On a successful Baltimore chop, the batter hits the ball forcefully into the ground, causing it to bounce so high that the batter reaches first base before the ball can be fielded and thrown to the first baseman.

The adoption of the foul strike rule in the early twentieth century quickly sent baseball from a high-scoring game to one where scoring runs became a struggle. Prior to the institution of this rule, foul balls were not counted as strikes: a batter could foul off any number of pitches with no strikes counted against him; this gave an enormous advantage to the batter. In 1901, the NL adopted the foul strike rule, and the AL followed suit in 1903.

After the 1919 World Series between the Chicago White Sox and Cincinnati Reds, baseball was rocked by allegations of a game fixing scheme known as the Black Sox Scandal. Eight players—"Shoeless" Joe Jackson, Eddie Cicotte, Claude "Lefty" Williams, George "Buck" Weaver, Arnold "Chick" Gandil, Fred McMullin, Charles "Swede" Risberg, and Oscar "Happy" Felsch—intentionally lost the World Series in exchange for a ring worth $100,000 ($1,712,780.35 in 2022 dollars). Despite being acquitted, all were permanently banned from Major League Baseball.

Rise in popularity
Baseball's popularity increased in the 1920s and 1930s. The 1920 season was notable for the death of Ray Chapman of the Cleveland Indians. Chapman, who was struck in the head by a pitch and died a few hours later, became the only MLB player to die of an on-field injury, a tragedy which led directly to both leagues requiring the placing into play new, white baseballs whenever a ball became scuffed or dirty, helping bring the "dead-ball" era to an end. The following year, the New York Yankees made their first World Series appearance. By the end of the 1930s, the team had appeared in 11 World Series, winning eight of them. Yankees slugger Babe Ruth had set the single-season home run record in 1927, hitting 60 home runs; a few years earlier, Ruth had set the same record with 29 home runs.

Affected by the difficulties of the Great Depression, baseball's popularity had begun a downward turn in the early 1930s. By 1932, only two MLB teams turned a profit. Attendance had fallen, due at least in part to a 10% federal amusement tax added to baseball ticket prices. Baseball owners cut their rosters from 25 men to 23 men, and even the best players took pay cuts. Team executives were innovative in their attempts to survive, creating night games, broadcasting games live by radio, and rolling out promotions such as free admission for women. Throughout the period of the Great Depression, no MLB teams moved or folded.

World War II era
The onset of World War II created a significant shortage of professional baseball players, as more than 500 men left MLB teams to serve in the military. Many of them played on service baseball teams that entertained military personnel in the US or in the Pacific. MLB teams of this time largely consisted of young men, older players, and those with a military classification of 4F, indicating mental, physical, or moral unsuitability for service. Men like Pete Gray, a one-armed outfielder, got the chance to advance to the major leagues. However, MLB rosters did not include any black players through the end of the war. Black players, many of whom served in the war, were still restricted to playing Negro league baseball.

Wartime blackout restrictions, designed to keep outdoor lighting at low levels, caused another problem for baseball. These rules limited traveling and night games to the point that the 1942 season nearly had to be canceled. On January 14, 1942, MLB Commissioner Kenesaw Mountain Landis wrote a letter to U.S. President Franklin D. Roosevelt and pleaded for the continuation of baseball during the war in hopes for a start of a new major league season. President Roosevelt responded, "I honestly feel that it would be best for the country to keep baseball going. There will be fewer people unemployed and everybody will work longer hours and harder than ever before. And that means that they ought to have a chance for recreation and for taking their minds off their work even more than before."

With the approval of President Roosevelt, spring training began in 1942 with few repercussions. The war interrupted the careers of stars including Stan Musial, Bob Feller, Ted Williams, and Joe DiMaggio, but baseball clubs continued to field their teams.

Breaking the color barrier

Branch Rickey, president and general manager of the Brooklyn Dodgers, began making efforts to introduce a black baseball player to the previously all-white professional baseball leagues in the mid-1940s. He selected Jackie Robinson from a list of promising Negro league players. After obtaining a commitment from Robinson to "turn the other cheek" to any racial antagonism directed at him, Rickey agreed to sign him to a contract for $600 a month. In what was later referred to as "The Noble Experiment", Robinson was the first black baseball player in the International League since the 1880s, joining the Dodgers' farm club, the Montreal Royals, for the 1946 season.

The following year, the Dodgers called up Robinson to the major leagues. On April 15, 1947, Robinson made his major league debut at Ebbets Field before a crowd of 26,623 spectators, including more than 14,000 black patrons. Black baseball fans began flocking to see the Dodgers when they came to town, abandoning the Negro league teams that they had followed exclusively. Robinson's promotion met a generally positive, although mixed, reception among newspaper writers and white major league players. Manager Leo Durocher informed his team, "I don't care if he is yellow or black or has stripes like a fucking zebra. I'm his manager and I say he plays."

After a strike threat by some players, NL President Ford Frick and Baseball Commissioner Happy Chandler let it be known that any striking players would be suspended. Robinson received significant encouragement from several major-league players, including Dodgers teammate Pee Wee Reese who said, "You can hate a man for many reasons. Color is not one of them." That year, Robinson won the inaugural Major League Baseball Rookie of the Year Award (separate NL and AL Rookie of the Year honors were not awarded until 1949).

Less than three months later, Larry Doby became the first African-American to break the color barrier in the American League with the Cleveland Indians. The next year, a number of other black players entered the major leagues. Satchel Paige was signed by the Indians and the Dodgers added star catcher Roy Campanella and Don Newcombe, who was later the first winner of the Cy Young Award for his outstanding pitching.

Women in baseball

MLB banned the signing of women to contracts in 1952, but that ban was lifted in 1992. There have been no female MLB players.

Relocation and expansion

From 1903 to 1953, the major leagues consisted of two eight-team leagues whose 16 teams were located in ten cities, all in the northeastern and midwestern United States: New York City had three teams and Boston, Chicago, Philadelphia, and St. Louis each had two teams. St. Louis was the southernmost and westernmost city with a major league team. The longest possible road trip, from Boston to St. Louis, took about 24 hours by railroad. After a half-century of stability, starting in the 1950s, teams began to move out of cities with multiple teams into cities that had not had them before. In three consecutive years from 1953 to 1955, three teams moved to new cities: the Boston Braves became the Milwaukee Braves, the St. Louis Browns became the Baltimore Orioles, and the Philadelphia Athletics became the Kansas City Athletics.

The 1958 Major League Baseball season was perhaps the pivotal season in making Major League Baseball a nationwide league. Walter O'Malley, owner of the Brooklyn Dodgers, moved his team to Los Angeles, marking the first major league franchise on the West Coast. Called "perhaps the most influential owner of baseball's early expansion era," O'Malley appeared on the cover of Time as a result of his efforts to move baseball to a more nationwide sport O'Malley was also influential in persuading the rival New York Giants to move west to become the San Francisco Giants. The Giants were already suffering from slumping attendance records at their aging ballpark, the Polo Grounds. Had the Dodgers moved out west alone, the St. Louis Cardinals— away—would have been the closest NL team. The joint move made West Coast road trips economical for visiting teams. O'Malley invited San Francisco Mayor George Christopher to New York to meet with Giants owner Horace Stoneham. Stoneham was considering moving the Giants to Minnesota, but he was convinced to join O'Malley on the West Coast at the end of 1957. The meetings between Stoneham, Christopher and O'Malley occurred against the wishes of Ford Frick, the Commissioner of Baseball. The dual moves were successful for both franchises—and for MLB. The Dodgers set a single-game MLB attendance record in their first home appearance with 78,672 fans.

In 1961, the first Washington Senators franchise moved to Minneapolis–St. Paul to become the Minnesota Twins. Two new teams were added to the American League at the same time: the Los Angeles Angels (who soon moved from downtown L.A. to nearby Anaheim) and a new Washington Senators franchise. The NL added the Houston Astros and the New York Mets in 1962. The Astros (known as the "Colt .45s" during their first three seasons) became the first southern major league franchise since the Louisville Colonels folded in 1899 and the first franchise to be located along the Gulf Coast. The Mets established a reputation for futility by going 40–120 during their first season of play in the nation's media capital—and by playing only a little better in subsequent campaigns—but in their eighth season (1969) the Mets became the first of the 1960s expansion teams to play in the postseason, culminating in a World Series title over the heavily favored Baltimore Orioles.

In 1966, the major leagues moved to the "Deep South" when the Braves moved to Atlanta. In 1968, the Kansas City Athletics moved west to become the Oakland Athletics. In 1969, the American and National Leagues both added two expansion franchises. The American League added the Seattle Pilots (who became the Milwaukee Brewers after one disastrous season in Seattle) and the Kansas City Royals. The NL added the first Canadian franchise, the Montreal Expos, as well as the San Diego Padres.

In 1972, the second Washington Senators moved to the Dallas–Fort Worth metroplex to become the Texas Rangers. In 1977, baseball expanded again, adding a second Canadian team, the Toronto Blue Jays, as well as the Seattle Mariners. Subsequently, no new teams were added until the 1990s and no teams moved until 2005.

Pitching dominance and rule changes

By the late 1960s, the balance between pitching and hitting had swung in favor of the pitchers. In 1968—later nicknamed "the year of the pitcher"—Boston Red Sox player Carl Yastrzemski won the American League batting title with an average of just .301, the lowest in the history of Major League Baseball. Detroit Tigers pitcher Denny McLain won 31 games, making him the only pitcher to win 30 games in a season since Dizzy Dean in 1934. St. Louis Cardinals starting pitcher Bob Gibson achieved an equally remarkable feat by allowing an ERA of just 1.12.

Following these pitching performances, in December 1968 the MLB Playing Rules Committee voted to reduce the strike zone from knees to shoulders to top of knees to armpits and lower the pitcher's mound from 15 to 10 inches, beginning in the 1969 season.

In 1973, the American League, which had been suffering from much lower attendance than the National League, sought to increase scoring even further by initiating the designated hitter (DH) rule.

New stadiums and artificial surfaces
Throughout the 1960s and 1970s, as baseball expanded, NFL football had been surging in popularity, making it economical for many of these cities to build multi-purpose stadiums instead of single-purpose baseball fields. Because of climate and economic issues, many of these facilities had playing surfaces made from artificial turf, as well as the oval designs characteristic of stadiums designed to house both baseball and football. This often resulted in baseball fields with relatively more foul territory than older stadiums. These characteristics changed the nature of professional baseball, putting a higher premium on speed and defense over home-run hitting power since the fields were often too big for teams to expect to hit many home runs and foul balls hit in the air could more easily be caught for outs.

Teams began to be built around pitching—particularly their bullpens—and speed on the basepaths. Artificial surfaces meant balls traveled quicker and bounced higher, so it became easier to hit ground balls "in the hole" between the corner and middle infielders. Starting pitchers were no longer expected to throw complete games; it was enough for a starter to pitch 6–7 innings and turn the game over to the team's closer, a position which grew in importance over these decades. As stolen bases increased, home run totals dropped. After Willie Mays hit 52 home runs in 1965, only one player (George Foster) reached that mark until the 1990s.

Scandals and a changing game
During the 1980s, baseball experienced a number of significant changes the game had not seen in years. Home runs were on the decline throughout the decade, with players hitting only 40 home runs just 13 times and no one hitting more than 50 home runs in a season for the first time since the Dead-ball era (1900–1919).

The 1981 Major League Baseball strike from June 12 until July 31 forced the cancellation of 713 total games and resulted in a split-season format.

In 1985, Pete Rose broke Ty Cobb's all-time hits record with his 4,192nd hit, and in 1989 Rose received a lifetime ban from baseball as a result of betting on baseball games while manager of the Cincinnati Reds. Rose was the first person to receive a lifetime ban from baseball since 1943. 1985 also saw the Pittsburgh drug trials which involved players who were called to testify before a grand jury in Pittsburgh related to cocaine trafficking.

The 1994–95 Major League Baseball strike from August 12, 1994, to April 25, 1995, caused the cancellation of over 900 games and the forfeit of the entire 1994 postseason.

In 2019, Major League Baseball opened an investigation into allegations that members of the 2017 World Series champion Houston Astros stole signs from opposing teams using technology during the 2017 and 2018 seasons. The Astros were found guilty in January 2020 and while no active players faced any repercussions, Astros general manager Jeff Luhnow and field manager A. J. Hinch were suspended for the entire 2020 season. The Astros were fined the maximum allowable $5 million and forfeited their first- and second-round picks in the 2020 and 2021 drafts.

Steroid era, further expansion and near contraction

Routinely in the late 1990s and early 2000s, baseball players hit 40 or 50 home runs in a season, a feat that was considered rare even in the 1980s. It has since become apparent that at least some of this power surge was a result of players using steroids and other performance-enhancing drugs.

In 1993, the NL added the Florida Marlins in Miami and the Colorado Rockies in Denver. In 1998, the Brewers switched leagues by joining the National League, and two new teams were added: the NL's Arizona Diamondbacks in Phoenix and the AL's Tampa Bay Devil Rays in Tampa Bay.

After the 2001 season, the team owners voted in favor of contraction. Several MLB teams had been considered for elimination in early talks about contraction, but the Montreal Expos and the Minnesota Twins were the two teams that came closest to folding under the plan. Plans for MLB contraction were halted when the Twins landlord was awarded a court injunction that required the team to play its 2002 home games at their stadium. MLB owners agreed to hold off on reducing the league's size until at least 2006.

The Montreal Expos became the first franchise in over three decades to move when they became the Washington Nationals in 2005. This move left Canada with just one team, but it also returned baseball to Washington after a 33-year absence. This franchise shift, like many previous ones, involved baseball's return to a city that had been previously abandoned. Not counting the short-lived Federal League, Montreal is the only city to host an MLB franchise since 1901 that, does not currently have a team.

The modern game 
In recent years, with the advent of technologies such as Statcast and its use of Hawk-Eye starting in 2020 as well as with advanced statistics as provided by sites such as FanGraphs and Baseball Savant, MLB has evolved. With the ability to see precise movements of pitchers and batters, teams can assess the mechanics of a player and help them improve. Statcast also provides some features such as tracking the paths of most batted balls, tracking the speed of most batted balls, and tracking the exit velocity of most batted balls. Statcast has allowed for advanced defensive analytics that have not been possible before tracking of players due to how subjective fielding can be.

The rate of teams using a defensive shift has gone up from 13.7% in 2016 to 33.6% in 2022 because advanced statistics support this as an effective way to stop hitters from getting hits. Because the shift reduces the amount of balls in play that result in hits and MLB wishes to increase interest in baseball, MLB announced in September 2022 that extreme infield defensive shifts would be banned starting in 2023. In order to be compliant, there must be two fielders on each side of second base, and those fielders must have both of their feet on the infield dirt at the time the pitch is thrown. If this rule is not followed, the choice of an automatic ball or the outcome of the play is given to the batting team.

The game of baseball has also slowed down significantly due to an increased number of strikeouts and walks—two outcomes that generally take many pitches to complete—and an increased amount of time taken for a pitcher to pitch. In 2020, it took an average of three hours and six minutes to complete a 9 inning game, a number which has steadily ticked up for years. Along with the restrictions on defensive shifts, the MLB announced the introduction of a pitch clock for the 2023 season and beyond, which is something that has been an experiment in MiLB for a few years. The pitch clock starts at 15 seconds. By the time the clock reaches 10 seconds, the catcher must be in their crouch behind home plate. When the clock reaches 8 seconds, the batter must be in the batter's box and be "alert". Before the 15 second timer reaches 0 seconds, the pitcher must have started their "motion to pitch". If any of these deadlines are violated, the count of the batter will be increased by one ball if the defending team violated the pitch clock or one strike if it is the offensive team who violated the pitch clock. Additionally, in order to prevent circumventing these rules pickoffs and step-offs which reset the pitch clock are only allowed two times total per plate appearance and, if a pitcher attempts a third pickoff and fails to get the runner out, a balk will be called. Similarly, a batter is restricted to calling a timeout (an action which resets the pitch clock) just once per plate appearance.

Uniforms

A baseball uniform is a type of uniform worn by baseball players, and by some non-playing personnel, such as field managers and coaches. It is worn to indicate the person's role in the game and—through the use of logos, colors, and numbers—to identify the teams and their players, managers, and coaches.

Traditionally, home uniforms display the team name on the front, while away uniforms display the team's home location. In modern times, however, exceptions to this pattern have become common, with teams using their team name on both uniforms. Most teams also have one or more alternate uniforms, usually consisting of the primary or secondary team color on the vest instead of the usual white or gray. In the past few decades throwback uniforms have become popular.

The New York Knickerbockers were the first baseball team to use uniforms, taking the field on April 4, 1849, in pants made of blue wool, white flannel shirts (jerseys) and straw hats. Caps and other types of headgear have been a part of baseball uniforms from the beginning. Baseball teams often wore full-brimmed straw hats or no cap at all since there was no official rule regarding headgear. Under the 1882 uniform rules, players on the same team wore uniforms of different colors and patterns that indicated which position they played. This rule was soon abandoned as impractical.

In the late 1880s, Detroit and Washington of the National League and Brooklyn of the American Association were the first to wear striped uniforms. By the end of the 19th century, teams began the practice of having two different uniforms, one for when they played at home in their own baseball stadium and a different one for when they played away (on the road) at the other team's ballpark. It became common to wear white pants with a white color vest at home and gray pants with a gray or solid (dark) colored vest when away. By 1900, both home and away uniforms were standard across the major leagues.

In June 2021, MLB announced a long-term deal with cryptocurrency exchange FTX, which includes the FTX logo appearing on umpire uniforms during all games. FTX is MLB's first-ever umpire uniform patch partner. On November 11, 2022, FTX filed for Chapter 11 bankruptcy protection.

Season structure

Spring training

Spring training is a series of practices and exhibition games preceding the start of the regular season. Teams hold training camps in the states of Arizona and Florida, where the early warm weather allows teams to practice and play without worrying about the late winter cold. Spring training allows new players to compete for roster and position spots and gives existing team players practice time prior to competitive play. The teams that hold spring training in Arizona are grouped into the Cactus League, while teams that hold camp in Florida are known as the Grapefruit League. Spring training has always attracted fan attention, drawing crowds who travel to the warmer climates to enjoy the weather and watch their favorite teams play, and spring training usually coincides with spring break for many college students. Autograph seekers also find greater access to players during spring training.

Spring training typically lasts almost two months, starting in mid-February and running until just before the season-opening day, traditionally the first week of April. As pitchers benefit from a longer training period, pitchers and catchers begin spring training several days before the rest of the team.

Regular season
Each team plays 162 games per season. A team's schedule is typically organized into three-game series, sets of consecutive games against the same opponent, with occasional two- or four-game series. Postponed games or continuations of suspended games can result in an ad hoc one-game or five-game series. All games of a series are usually hosted by the same team and multiple series are typically grouped together. I.e, a team usually hosts several series in a row, called a homestand, and follows that by going on several road series in a row. Teams generally play games five to seven days per week. Most games are scheduled at night, although teams will often play day games on Opening Day, holidays, and for the last game of a series to allow teams extra time to travel to their next opponent. Sunday games are generally played during the afternoon, allowing teams to travel to their next destination prior to a Monday night game.

In the current three-division structure, each team plays 19 games against each of its four divisional opponents. It plays one home series and one away series, amounting to six or seven games, against the 10 other teams in its league. A team also plays one of the divisions in the other league, rotating each year, with two opponents in a three-game home series, two in a three-game away series, and one with four games split between home and away. Furthermore, each team has an interleague "natural rival" (in many cases its counterpart in the same metro area) with which it plays two home games and two away games each year.

With an odd number of teams in each league (15), it is necessary to have two teams participate in interleague play for most days in the season, except when two or more teams have a day off. Each team plays 20 interleague games throughout the season, usually with just one interleague game per day, but for one weekend in late May, all teams will participate in an interleague series. Before 2013, interleague play was structured differently: there would be one weekend in mid-May and another period consisting typically of the last two-thirds of June in which all teams played interleague games (save for two NL teams each day), and no interleague games were scheduled outside those dates. (Before 2013, season-long interleague play was not necessary, because each league had an even number of teams. In 2013, the Houston Astros moved to the American League, so that each league would have 15 teams.) Prior to the adoption of the universal designated hitter in 2022, whether the DH was in use depended on whether the home team was from the AL, where the DH was used, or the NL, where it was not.

Starting with the 2023 season, the scheduling formula is set to change, with each team playing at least one series against every other team every year. Each team will play 14 games against teams in the same division, with one 3-game and one 4-game series at each park, six games against teams within the same league but in other divisions, with one 3-game series at each park, and one 3-game series against teams in the other league, alternating home teams each year, except for each team's designated interleague rival, which will continue to consist of two 2-game series at each of the teams' home parks.

Beginning with the 2022 season, teams compete for the six playoff berths in their respective leagues. To secure a berth, a team must either win its division or capture a wild card spot by having one of the three best records among the non-winners in its entire league. With the adoption of a third wild card, the former practice of breaking ties with an additional regular-season game, known as  game 163, was dropped in favor of a tie-breaker formula.

All-Star Game

In early-to-mid July, just after the midway point of the season, the Major League Baseball All-Star Game is held during a four-day break from the regular-season schedule. The All-Star Game features a team of players from the American League (AL)—led by the manager of the previous AL World Series team—and a team of players from the National League (NL), similarly managed, in an exhibition game. From 1959 to 1962, two games were held each season, one was held in July and one was held in August. The designated-hitter rule was used in the All-Star Game for the first time in 1989. Following games used a DH when the game was played in an AL ballpark. Since 2010, the DH rule has been in effect regardless of venue.

The first official All-Star Game was held as part of the 1933 World's Fair in Chicago, Illinois, and was the idea of Arch Ward, then sports editor for The Chicago Tribune. Initially intended to be a one-time event, its great success resulted in making the game an annual one. Ward's contribution was recognized by Major League Baseball in 1962 with the creation of the "Arch Ward Trophy", given to the All-Star Game's Most Valuable Player each year. (In 1970, it was renamed the Commissioner's Trophy, until 1985, when the name change was reversed. In 2002, it was renamed the Ted Williams Most Valuable Player Award.)

Beginning in 1947, the eight position players in each team's starting lineup have been voted into the game by fans. The fan voting was discontinued after a 1957 ballot-box-stuffing scandal in Cincinnati: seven of the eight slots originally went to Reds players, two of whom were subsequently removed from the lineup to make room for Willie Mays and Hank Aaron. Fan voting was reinstated in 1970 and has continued ever since, including Internet voting in recent years.

The 2002 contest in Milwaukee controversially ended in an 11-inning tie when both managers ran out of pitchers. In response, starting in 2003 the league which wins the All-Star game received home-field advantage in the World Series: the league champion hosted the first two games at its own ballpark as well as the last two (if necessary). The National League did not win an All-Star game and thus gain a home-field advantage until 2010; it was able to overcome this disadvantage and win in three of the seven World Series from 2003 to 2009. This was discontinued after the 2016 season.

MLB All-Stars from both leagues have worn uniforms from their respective teams at the game with one exception. In the 1933 All-Star Game, the National League All-Star Team members wore special gray uniforms with "National League" written in navy blue letters across the front of the jersey.

On July 3, 2020, it was announced that the 2020 Major League Baseball All-Star Game scheduled to be held in Los Angeles would not be played due to the COVID-19 pandemic. As compensation, Los Angeles was awarded the next available All-Star Game in 2022.

Postseason

The regular season ends after the first Sunday in October (or the last Sunday in September), after which twelve teams enter the postseason playoffs. These twelve teams consist of the six division champions and six "wild-card" teams: the team with the best overall win–loss record in each of the six divisions, and the three teams in each league with the best records other than the division champions. Four rounds of series of games are played to determine the champion:

 Wild Card Series, a best of three games playoff between the lowest seeded division champion and three "wild-card teams", the higher seeds will host all three games 
 American League Division Series and National League Division Series, each a best-of-five-games series.
 American League Championship Series and National League Championship Series, each a best-of-seven-games series played between the winning teams from the Division Series. The league champions are referred to as the pennant winners.
 World Series, a best-of-seven-games series played between the pennant winners of each league.

Within each league, the division winners are the No. 1, No. 2, and No. 3 seeds, based on win–loss records. The team with the best record among non-division winners will be the first wildcard and the No. 4 seed. The team with the second-best record among non-division winners will be the second wildcard and the No. 5 seed. The team with the third-best record will the third wild card and the No 6. seed  In the wildcard round, the No. 3 seed will host the No 6 seed and the No. 4 seed with host the No 5 seed with the higher team host all three games in the Wild Card Series . For the division series, the matchup will be the No. 1 seed against the  winner of the No 3 and  No 6 seed and the No. 2 seed against the winner of  No 4 and No 5 seed, unlike the NFL there will be no reseeding   Since 2017, home-field advantage in the World Series is determined by regular-season records of the two league champions, replacing a system used for the prior 14 seasons where the champion of the league that won the All-Star Game would receive home-field advantage.

Because each postseason series is split between the home fields of the two teams, the home-field advantage does not usually play a large role in the postseason unless the series goes to its maximum number of games, giving one team an additional game at home. However, the first two games of a postseason series are hosted by the same team. That team may have an increased chance of starting the series with two wins, thereby gaining some momentum for the rest of the series.

International play

Since 1986 an All-Star team from MLB is sent to a biennial end-of-the-season tour of Japan, dubbed as MLB Japan All-Star Series, playing exhibition games in a best-of format against the All-Stars from Nippon Professional Baseball (NPB) or recently as of 2014 their national team Samurai Japan.

In 2008, MLB played the MLB China Series in the People's Republic of China. It was a series of two spring-training games between the San Diego Padres and Los Angeles Dodgers. The games were an effort to popularize baseball in China.

MLB played the MLB Taiwan All-Star Series in Taiwan in November 2011. It was a series of five exhibition games played by a team made up of MLB players called the MLB All-Stars and the Chinese Taipei national baseball team. The MLB All-Stars swept the series, five games to zero. At the end of the 2011 season, it was announced that the Seattle Mariners and the Oakland Athletics would play their season openers in Japan. In October 2013, Phil Rogers of the Chicago Tribune wrote that MLB was considering postseason all-star tours in Taiwan and Korea; baseball is increasing in popularity in both countries.

The Arizona Diamondbacks opened the 2014 season against Los Angeles Dodgers on March 22–23 in Australia. The teams played each other at the historic Sydney Cricket Ground, which has a seating capacity of 46,000. The two games represented the first MLB regular-season play held in that country. The games counted as home games for the Diamondbacks, so they played 79 home games at Chase Field.

In 2019, the Red Sox were the home team in a regular-season two-game series against the Yankees. The games, which were the first regular-season MLB games held in Europe, were played on June 29–30 at London Stadium with the Yankees winning both games.

Together with the World Baseball Softball Confederation, MLB sponsors the World Baseball Classic, an international baseball tournament contested by national teams.

Performance-enhancing drugs

In 1998, both Mark McGwire and Sammy Sosa hit more home runs than the record of 61 set by Yankees right fielder Roger Maris in 1961. Barry Bonds topped the record in 2001 with 73 home runs. McGwire, Bonds, and Sosa became the subjects of speculation regarding the use of performance-enhancing substances. McGwire later admitted that he used a steroid hormone that was still legal in baseball during the 1998 season. Baseball's original steroid testing policy, in effect from 2002 to 2005, provided for penalties ranging from a ten-game suspension for a first positive test to a one-year suspension for a fourth positive test. Players were tested at least once per year, with the chance that several players could be tested many times per year.

A 2006 book, Game of Shadows by San Francisco Chronicle investigative reporters Lance Williams and Mark Fainaru-Wada, chronicled alleged extensive use of performance enhancers, including several types of steroids and growth hormone by baseball superstars Barry Bonds, Gary Sheffield, and Jason Giambi. Former Senate Majority Leader George Mitchell was appointed by Selig on March 30, 2006 to investigate the use of performance-enhancing drugs in MLB. The appointment was made after several influential members of the U.S. Congress made negative comments about both the effectiveness and honesty of MLB's drug policies and Commissioner Selig.

The day before the Mitchell Report was to be released in 2007, Selig said, "I haven't seen the report yet, but I'm proud I did it." The report said that after mandatory random testing began in 2004, HGH treatment for athletic enhancement became popular among players, as HGH is not detectable in tests. It pointed out that HGH is likely a placebo with no performance-enhancing effects. The report included substance use allegations against at least one player from each MLB team.

According to ESPN, some people questioned whether Mitchell's director role with the Boston Red Sox created a conflict of interest, especially because no "prime [Sox] players were in the report." The report named several prominent Yankees who were parts of World Series clubs; there is a long-running and fierce Yankees–Red Sox rivalry. Former U.S. prosecutor John M. Dowd brought up Mitchell's conflict of interest, but he later said that the former senator had done a good job. Mitchell acknowledged that his "tight relationship with Major League Baseball left him open to criticism", but he said that readers who examine the report closely "will not find any evidence of bias, of special treatment of the Red Sox".

On January 10, 2013, MLB and the players union reached an agreement to add random, in-season HGH testing. They also agreed to implement a new test to reveal the use of testosterone for the 2013 season. The current MLB drug policy provides for an 80-game suspension for a first positive test, a 162-game suspension for a second positive test, and a lifetime suspension for a third positive test. In 2009, allegations surfaced against Alex Rodriguez and David Ortiz, and Manny Ramirez received a 50-game suspension after testing positive for banned substances. In early April 2011, Ramirez retired from baseball rather than face a 100-game suspension for his second positive steroid test. He would later unretire, having the suspension dropped to 50 games, and would serve those in 2012.

Media coverage

Television

Several networks televise baseball games, including Fox, ESPN, TBS, and MLB Network. Since 2008, Fox Sports has broadcast MLB games on Fox Saturday Baseball throughout the entire season; Fox previously only broadcast games from May to September. Fox also holds rights to the All-Star Game each season. Fox also alternates League Championship Series broadcasts, broadcasting the American League Championship Series (ALCS) in odd-numbered years and the National League Championship Series (NLCS) in even-numbered years. Fox broadcasts all games of the World Series. ESPN continues to broadcast MLB games as well, beginning with national Opening Day coverage. ESPN broadcasts Sunday Night Baseball and Baseball Tonight. ESPN also has rights to the Home Run Derby at the All-Star Game each July.

TBS has aired Sunday afternoon regular season games (non-exclusive) nationally, but beginning in 2022 this will be replaced by Tuesday night games. In 2007, TBS began its exclusive rights to any tiebreaker games that determine division or wild card champions. It also airs exclusive coverage of the Division Series round of the playoffs. TBS carries the League Championship Series that are not included under Fox's television agreement; TBS shows the NLCS in odd-numbered years and the ALCS in even-numbered years.

In January 2009, MLB launched the MLB Network, featuring news and coverage from around the league, and airing 26 live games in the 2009 season. Each team also has local broadcasts for all games not carried by Fox on Saturdays or ESPN on Sunday nights. These games are typically split between a local broadcast television station and a local or regional sports network (RSN), though some teams only air local games through RSNs or through their own team networks. As Canada only contains one team, Sportsnet broadcasts Toronto Blue Jays games nationally. The channel is owned by Rogers Communications, who is also the parent company of the Blue Jays. Sportsnet also televises Fox's Saturday afternoon games, the All-Star Game, playoff games, and the World Series. In April 2011, TSN2 began carrying ESPN Sunday Night Baseball in Canada. TVA Sports airs Blue Jays games in French.

Several MLB games are broadcast exclusively on Internet television. After a year of exclusive games on Facebook, MLB partnered with YouTube to stream weekly games on the service beginning in the 2019 season, and extending until 2022. In 2022, MLB made a deal with Apple Inc. to launch Friday Night Baseball on its Apple TV+ streaming service, and NBC Sports to broadcast MLB Sunday Leadoff, a package of early Sunday afternoon games on Peacock.

Blackout policy

MLB has several blackout rules. A local broadcaster has priority to televise games of the team in their market over national broadcasters if the game is not exclusive to the national broadcaster. A market that has a local team playing in a non-exclusive game will receive an alternative programming feed on the national broadcaster. MLB's streaming internet video service is also subject to the same blackout rules.

Radio and Internet

ESPN Radio holds national broadcast rights and broadcasts Sunday Night Baseball weekly throughout the season in addition to all playoff games. The rights to the World Series are exclusive to ESPN. In 2021, TUDN Radio picked up Spanish-language rights to MLB games, starting with that year's postseason.

In addition, each team employs its own announcers, who broadcast during the regular season. Most teams operate regional networks to cover their fan bases; some of these supposedly regional networks (such as the New York Yankees Radio Network) have a national reach with affiliates located across the United States. Major League Baseball has an exclusive rights deal with XM Satellite Radio, which includes the channel MLB Network Radio and live play-by-play of all games. Both Canadian teams (the Montreal Expos before their move to Washington, DC in 2005, and the Toronto Blue Jays) have produced radio broadcasts in French.

MLB games are also broadcast live on the internet. All television and radio broadcasts of games are available via subscription to MLB.tv at Major League Baseball's website, MLB.com, and radio-only broadcasts are also available via subscription to MLB.com Gameday Audio. Radio station affiliates are officially forbidden from streaming games through their Internet feeds. Blackout rules are still applied for live television broadcasts, but not radio broadcasts.

International broadcasting
ESPN Deportes televises many MLB games in Spanish throughout Latin America. Wapa 2 airs games in Puerto Rico, including spring training games and most of the World Baseball Classic games involving the team from Puerto Rico. In Brazil, ESPN Brasil has exclusive rights on TV (ESPN and ESPN2) and Internet (WatchESPN),.

Five in the United Kingdom previously screened MLB games, including the All-Star Game and the postseason games, on Sunday and Wednesday usually starting at 1 a.m. BST. Most recently, Johnny Gould and Josh Chetwynd presented MLB on Five on that station. The channel covered baseball beginning on its opening night in 1997, but for financial reasons, the decision was made not to pick up MLB for the 2009 season. BT Sport ESPN show live and recorded games several times a week—it is available with BT Sport and (on a subscriber-basis) Virgin Media in the UK. ESPN America televised many games in the UK and dozens of other countries; in May 2013, ESPN announced that it would shut down the channel on July 31, 2013.

In Australia, MLB games are regularly shown on ESPN Australia (subscription).

In the Middle East, North Africa and France, MLB games are broadcast on beIN Sports channels.

In Germany MLB games will be broadcast from 2022 exclusively on Sport1 until 2026.

In Hungary, MLB games are broadcast on Sport1 as of 2020.

See also

 Australian Baseball League
 Baseball Assistance Team (B.A.T.)
 Baseball in Canada
 Baseball in the United States
 Bob Feller Act of Valor Award
 Comparison of Major League Baseball and Nippon Professional Baseball
 List of all-time Major League Baseball win–loss records
 List of American and Canadian cities by number of major professional sports franchises
 List of current Major League Baseball stadiums
 List of former Major League Baseball stadiums
 List of Major League Baseball awards
 List of Major League Baseball managers
 List of Major League Baseball retired numbers
 List of Major League Baseball spring training ballparks
 List of professional sports leagues
 List of professional sports teams in the United States and Canada
 Major League Baseball attendance records
 Major League Baseball draft
 MLB Industry Growth Fund
 Reviving Baseball in Inner Cities

References

Explanatory notes

Citations

Further reading
 Banner, Stuart. The Baseball Trust: A History of Baseball's Antitrust Exemption. New York: Oxford University Press, 2013.
 Bouton, Jim. Ball Four: My Life and Hard Times Throwing the Knuckleball in the Major Leagues. World Publishing Company, 1970.
 Buchanan, Lamont, The World Series and Highlights of Baseball, E. P. Dutton & Company, 1951.
 Cohen, Richard M., Neft, David, Johnson, Roland T., Deutsch, Jordan A., The World Series, 1976, Dial Press.
 Deutsch, Jordan A., Cohen, Richard M., Neft, David, Johnson, Roland T., The Scrapbook History of Baseball, Bobbs-Merrill Company, 1975.
 King, Corretta. Jackie Robinson. New York: Chelsea House Publishers, 1987.
 James, Bill. The Historical Baseball Abstract. New York: Villard, 1985 (with many subsequent editions).
 Lanigan, Ernest, Baseball Cyclopedia, 1922, originally published by Baseball Magazine.
 Lansch, Jerry, Glory Fades Away: The Nineteenth Century World Series Rediscovered, Taylor Publishing, 1991. .
 Murphy, Cait. Crazy '08: How a Cast of Cranks, Rogues, Boneheads, and Magnates Created the Greatest Year in Baseball History. New York: Smithsonian Books, 2007. .
 Okkonen, Marc. Baseball Uniforms of the 20th Century: The Official Major League Baseball Guide, 1991.
 Ritter, Lawrence. The Glory of their Times. New York: MacMillan, 1966. Revised edition, New York: William Morrow, 1984.
 Ross, Brian. "Band of Brothers". Minor League News, April 6, 2005. Available at Minor League News.
 Seymour, Harold. Baseball: The Early Years. 2v. New York: Oxford University Press, 1960. .
 Turkin, Hy, and Thompson, S. C., The Official Encyclopedia of Baseball, 1951, A.S. Barnes and Company
 Tygiel, Jules. Past Time: Baseball as History. New York: Oxford University Press, 2000. .
 The New York Times, The Complete Book of Baseball: A Scrapbook History, 1980, Bobbs Merrill.

External links

 
MLB on YouTube

 
 
 
1869 establishments in the United States
Sports leagues established in 1869
Baseball governing bodies in the United States
Professional sports leagues in Canada
Professional sports leagues in the United States
Sports organizations established in 1869
Multi-national professional sports leagues